Cyril Chukwuka Anyanwu  was an Anglican bishop in Nigeria.

Ogunedo was educated at and ordained in 1963. He was the pioneer Bishop of Mbaise from 1994 until his death in 1999.

Notes

Trinity Theological College, Umuahia alumni
Anglican bishops of Mbaise
20th-century Anglican bishops in Nigeria
1999 deaths
Year of birth missing